Murray Witcombe (born 1 November 1956) is a former Australian rules footballer who played for Geelong in the Victorian Football League (now known as the Australian Football League).

References

External links
 
 

1956 births
Living people
Geelong Football Club players
Australian rules footballers from Victoria (Australia)
People educated at Geelong College